Gobiosuchidae is a family of Cretaceous crocodyliforms known from Mongolia and Spain.

Genera 
Three genera are currently classified within Gobiosuchidae: Cassissuchus, Gobiosuchus, and Zaraasuchus.

Synapomorphies 
According to Pol & Norell (2004), gobiosuchids form a clade united by the following synapomorphies:

 Parietal without broad occipital portion
 Absence of external mandibular fenestra
 More than two parallel rows of dorsal osteoderms
 Cranial table as wide as ventral portion of skull
 Palpebrals sutured to each other and the frontal, excluding it from the orbital margin
 External surface of ascending process of jugal exposed posterolaterally
 Longitudinal ridge on lateral surface of jugal below infratemporal fenestra
 Dorsal surface of posterolateral process of squamosal ornamented with three longitudinal ridges
 Presence of a sharp ridge along ventral surface of angular
 Surangular with a longitudinal ridge on its dorsolateral surface
 Dorsal surface of osteoderms ornamented with anterolaterally and anteromedially directed ridges
 Cervical region surrounded by lateral and ventral osteoderms sutured to the dorsal elements
 Presence of appendicular osteoderms
 Closed, or incipiently close, supratemporal fenestra

Sources 
 Pol, D. & Norell, M. A., (2004). "A new gobiosuchid crocodyliform taxon from the Cretaceous of Mongolia". American Museum Novitates 3458: 1-31.

References

Early Cretaceous crocodylomorphs
Late Cretaceous crocodylomorphs
Terrestrial crocodylomorphs
Early Cretaceous first appearances
Late Cretaceous extinctions
Prehistoric reptile families